Joan Francesc Ferrer Sicilia (born 1 January 1970), commonly known as Rubi, is a Spanish former footballer who played as a winger, currently manager of UD Almería.

Playing career
Born in Vilassar de Mar, Barcelona, Catalonia, Rubi never competed in higher than Segunda División B during a ten-year senior career. He started out at local club UE Vilassar de Mar, in 1989.

Rubi appeared in the promotion playoffs to Segunda División with both AEC Manlleu and Terrassa FC, falling short on both occasions. Whilst with the former, he scored in a 3–3 away draw against Extremadura CF on 29 May 1994, but the team eventually finished in second position in their group.

Coaching career
Rubi began working as a coach with Vilassar de Mar, and subsequently was in charge of several Tercera División sides in his native region. He was also promoted to the third division with RCD Espanyol B, in 2006.

After a short stint with UD Ibiza-Eivissa, Rubi was appointed at Benidorm CF. He left the club in the end of the campaign, after achieving a sixth-place finish in the third tier.

On 8 June 2012, Rubi signed with Girona FC after having been part of the staff in previous years. He took the team to the best season of their history, leading them to the fourth position in division two and being eventually knocked out in the play-offs.

Rubi left Girona and joined FC Barcelona on 28 June 2013, being added to Tito Vilanova's staff. On 3 June of the following year, he replaced dismissed Juan Ignacio Martínez at the helm of Real Valladolid.

After failing to win promotion to La Liga in 2015 Segunda División play-offs Rubi was replaced by Gaizka Garitano on 6 July 2015. On 28 October, he was appointed manager of Levante UD, taking over from the sacked Lucas Alcaraz. He only managed to collect seven wins until the end of the season, the side returned to the second tier after a six-year stay and he was relieved of his duties on 26 May 2016.

Rubi took over at Sporting de Gijón on 18 January 2017, in the place of Abelardo. In June, following their relegation, he was hired at SD Huesca.

On 25 May 2018, after leading the Aragonese side to their first-ever promotion to the first division, Rubi announced he would leave the club at the end of the campaign. He returned to Espanyol on 3 June, being appointed manager of the first team also in the top flight.

On 6 June 2019, Rubi left Espanyol after paying his release clause, and was appointed Real Betis manager just hours later. He was dismissed on 21 June of the following year, with the club eight points above the relegation zone with as many games left to play.

Rubi signed a two-and-a-half-year contract with UD Almería on 28 April 2021, replacing José Manuel Gomes even though the team was placed third with six matches to go. He won the league in his first full season, thus returning to the top tier after seven years.

Managerial statistics

Honours
Almería
Segunda División: 2021–22

References

External links

1970 births
Living people
People from Vilassar de Mar
Sportspeople from the Province of Barcelona
Spanish footballers
Footballers from Catalonia
Association football wingers
Segunda División B players
Tercera División players
Divisiones Regionales de Fútbol players
UE Vilassar de Mar players
AEC Manlleu footballers
RCD Espanyol B footballers
CE L'Hospitalet players
Pontevedra CF footballers
Terrassa FC footballers
Spanish football managers
La Liga managers
Segunda División managers
Segunda División B managers
Tercera División managers
CE L'Hospitalet managers
CE Sabadell FC managers
RCD Espanyol B managers
Girona FC managers
Real Valladolid managers
Levante UD managers
Sporting de Gijón managers
SD Huesca managers
RCD Espanyol managers
Real Betis managers
UD Almería managers
FC Barcelona non-playing staff